Rain in the Heart is a 1990 Hong Kong television serial drama produced by TVB and starring Roger Kwok, Dominic Lam, Kathy Chow and Gallen Lo.

Plot
The series tells the story of three youth who have complications in their work and relationships and how they fight to survive and finally shake hands with each other and proceed to the road of success.

Cast
Roger Kwok as Lau Ka-wai (劉家偉)
Dominic Lam as Cheung Shun-pan (張順品)
Yip Sai-kuen
Wayne Lai
Chan Kwok-chi
Tam Ping-man
Pak Yan
Tomi Wong as Chong Lai-seung (莊麗裳)
Winnie Lau as Cheung Chi-san (張紫珊)
Liliy Liu
Lau Siu-wai
Chan Pui-san
Chun Hung
Kong Ming-fai
Wong Chung-chi
Ng Sui-ting
Tsui Kwong-lam
Kwan Hoi-san as Lau Hing-sing (劉慶成)
Sin Lin-po
Siu San-yan
Wong Sing-seung
Nam Hung as Lau Suk-chun (劉淑珍)
Albert Lo
Wong Man-yee
Au-yeung Sa-fei
Stella Wong
Mui Chi-ching
Ho Mei-ting as Lee Yuk-yin (李玉賢)
Leung Po-ching
Chan Kwan-yung
Ng Po-kwan
Lo Tin-wai
Josephine Lam as Kong Ho-ning (江可寧)
Gilbert Lam
Gallen Lo as Chung Man-kit (鐘文傑)
Lau Wan
Leung Siu-chau
Ho Pik-kin
Wong San
Shek Wan
Chan Chung-kin
Wong Wai
Lam Yin-ming
Pamela Peck
Leung Oi
Tin Wing-ka
Cheung Pik-kei
Chan Yuk-lun
Leo Tsang
Lai Koon-sing
Ling Lai-man
Kathy Chow as Tung Yiu (童瑤)
Wong Yat-fei
Gordon Lam
Keung Wai-nam
Hui Sat-yin
Cheung Ching
Shally Tsang
Tam Siu-ming
Ngan Chiu-hung
Ting Yan
Lily Leung
Benz Hui
Hau Wai-wan
Tang Hin-wing
Mak Ho-wai
Wu Ying-man
Steve Lee
Tam Chuen-hing
Angelina Lo
Chan Min-leung
Wong Ying-yiu
Yu Mo-lin
Wan Seung-yin
Chan Wai-yu
Ma Siu-fu
Tam Yat-ching
Felix Lok as Simon
Power Chan
Wong Kin-fung
Tsang Yiu-ming
Lee Hin-ming
Sit Chun
Sam Tsang
Hon Chun
Wong Fung-king
Lai Hoi-san
Wong Wai-leung
Lee Wai-man
Pang Chun-fai
Chu Siu-kei
Lee Wong-sang
Lee Kwai-ying
Dickson Lee
Yip Pik-wan
Wong Hung-kam
Lung Hin
Frankie Lam
Lee Chung-ning
Tai Siu-man
Chow Tin-tak
Ling Hon
Bak Man-biu
Cheng Siu-ping
Keung Wai-nam
Chu Sing-choi
Yan Wah
Yeung Chi-to
Ben Wong
Suen Kwai-hing
Chan Pui-man
David Siu

See also
List of TVB series (1990)

External links
TVB Official website

TVB dramas
1990 Hong Kong television series debuts
1990 Hong Kong television series endings
Hong Kong television shows
Serial drama television series
Cantonese-language television shows
Works by Susan Chan